Episcepsis endodasia is a moth of the family Erebidae. It was described by George Hampson in 1898. It is found in Paraná, Brazil.

References

External links
E. endodasia at BHL

Euchromiina
Moths described in 1898